Sukur (Adikimmu Sukur, Gemasakun, Sakul, Sugur, Sakun) is a Biu–Mandara language of Madgali LGA, Adamawa State, Nigeria.

References

External links 
 ELAR archive of Sakun (Sukur) Language Documentation

Languages of Nigeria
Biu-Mandara languages